Plainfield South High School, or PSHS, is a four-year public high school located in  Plainfield, Illinois, a southwest suburb of Chicago, Illinois, in the United States. It is part of the Plainfield Community Consolidated School District 202, which also includes three other high schools: Plainfield Central High School, Plainfield North High School and Plainfield East High School.
The school's address, phone number, and school district belong to Plainfield, however, the school is within the Joliet city limits.

Administration 

The first principal, Thomas A. Hinsel, served from the opening of the school until 2004. 
Second principal was Dan Goggins who served 2004-2010.
Third principal David Travis served 2010-2015.

The current and fourth principal of Plainfield South High School is Bob Yanello since 2015.
The current associate principal is Phil Pakowski. The assistant principals are Rich Golminas (discipline) and Kristi Boe (student services). The special education administrator is Beth Sanna.

Campus 

The school is located on the corner of Caton Farm Road and Ridge Road. The school has over 200 classrooms. Facilities include a fieldhouse, an auditorium, a competition gymnasium, and a cafeteria. A 4000-seat stadium, baseball and softball diamonds, tennis courts, and a track are among outdoor facilities.

Athletics and activities

Activities

Source:

Athletics

The 2010 Boys' Bowling Team won the state championship, the first school in District 202 history to win a state title in any sport. The track team has had recent success, winning sixth place in the state finals in 2010. In the summer of 2016 and 2018, the school baseball team won the Summer State Championship. Plainfield South won the 2022 3A Boys State Cross Country Championship.

References

External links
 
 Plainfield High School Hockey Association Website

Public high schools in Illinois
Educational institutions established in 2001
Education in Joliet, Illinois
Plainfield, Illinois
Schools in Kendall County, Illinois
2001 establishments in Illinois